Høgtunga is a mountain in Lom Municipality in Innlandet county, Norway. The mountain is surrounded by several other notable mountains including Reinstinden to the north; Surtningssue to the northeast; Tjønnholstinden and Knutsholstinden to the southeast; Store Rauddalseggi to the west; and Storådalshøi, Hinnotefjellet, Nestsøre Hellstugutinden, and Søre Hellstugutinden to the northwest.

See also
List of mountains of Norway by height

References

Jotunheimen
Lom, Norway
Mountains of Innlandet